The 2013 Vattenfall Cyclassics was the 18th running of the Vattenfall Cyclassics single-day cycling race.

In a mass sprint finish, the race was won by  rider John Degenkolb, Degenkolb finished ahead of 's André Greipel and 's Alexander Kristoff, who completed the podium.

Teams
As the Vattenfall Cyclassics was a UCI World Tour event, all 19 UCI ProTeams were invited automatically and obligated to send a squad. Two other squads –  and  – were given wildcard places into the race and as such, formed the event's 21-team peloton.

The 21 teams that competed in the race were:

 †

 †

Results

External links

Vattenfall Cyclassics
Vattenfall Cyclassics
2013